Francis Arthur John French, 7th Baron de Freyne of Coolavin, County Sligo (3 September 1927 – 24 November 2009) was an Anglo-Irish aristocrat, son of Francis French, 6th Baron de Freyne and Lina Victoria (née Arnott). He was educated at Ladycross School (Seaford, East Sussex) and at Glenstal Abbey School (County Limerick).

He inherited his title in 1935, at which time, until 1999, he could vote in the House of Lords. In 1999, all but 90 or so hereditary peers were stripped of voting rights in the Lords by Tony Blair's Labour government. Lord de Freyne was a Knight of the Sovereign Military Order of Malta.

In 1952, Lord de Freyne sold French Park, the family's ancestral home in Frenchpark, County Roscommon. Due to the successive Irish Land Acts, the remaining estate lands proved too small to sustain the running of the estate and the "Big House". The great house and demesne had been in the French family since  were granted to Dominick French in 1666; prior to its dissemination during the Land Acts the estate comprised . Having sold the estate, the family moved to Oxfordshire.

Marriages & children
He married, firstly, Shirley Ann Pobjoy, daughter of Douglas Rudolph Pobjoy, on 30 January 1954; that union ended in divorce in 1978. He married, secondly, to Sheelin Deidre O'Kelly, daughter of Lt.-Col. Henry Kane O'Kelly, of County Wicklow, in July 1978.

By his first wife, Lord De Freyne had three children;
 Fulke Charles Arthur John French, 8th Baron de Freyne (b. 21 April 1957)
 Hon. Vanessa Rose Bradbury French (b. 19 September 1958)
 Hon. Patrick Dominic Fitzstephen Jude (b. 27 November 1969)

Arms

References

1927 births
2009 deaths
People from County Roscommon
Barons in the Peerage of the United Kingdom
Eldest sons of British hereditary barons
People educated at Ladycross School
People educated at Glenstal Abbey School
Place of birth missing
Place of death missing
Knights of Malta
de Freyne